"My Heart Draws a Dream" is the thirty-second single by L'Arc-en-Ciel, released on August 29, 2007. It reached number 1 on the Oricon chart.

Track listing

Sales

Oricon sales chart (Japan)

References

2007 singles
L'Arc-en-Ciel songs
Oricon Weekly number-one singles
Songs written by Hyde (musician)
Songs written by Ken (musician)
2007 songs
Ki/oon Music singles